

History
The earliest evidence found of the old state road system is on a 1917 State Road Department map; in 1923 the Florida State Legislature began writing the routes into law. Every two years, when the legislature met, new roads were added, at first by number, and later giving the SRD the ability to choose a number. Many routes, specifically SR 2, had not only a main route, but spurs and loops to different places. These were mostly caused by the Legislature. Even when a road was also a U.S. Highway, the State Road number was signed.

Up to and including 1939, every road written into law by the Legislature was given a number by the SRD. This included the range from SR 397 to SR 449, which included most of the 1926 Bond Issue Roads in Orange County and some other major roads. The 1939 numbering ended with SR 545; 546 to 549 were skipped.

In 1941, many laws were passed assigning not only the main roads, as had been done in Orange County, but a lot of minor roads, to the State Road System in many counties. FDOT did not give these all numbers. Information about which were assigned is sparse. Very few roads were added in 1943 and 1945 due to World War II; the system got to at least SR 625, added in 1945. A state law passed in 1941 authorized a renumbering; this didn't happen until 1945, also because of the war.

Table
Not all routes after 545 are in the table, since that information is much more limited.

Current Florida State Roads are on a separate page.

See also
1945 Florida State Road renumbering
List of state roads in Florida (post-1945)

References

State Roads